The 1997–98 NBA season was the Bucks' 30th season in the National Basketball Association. In the off-season, the Bucks acquired All-Star guard Terrell Brandon and Tyrone Hill from the Cleveland Cavaliers in a three-team trade. The team also selected Danny Fortson from the University of Cincinnati with the tenth pick in the 1997 NBA draft, but soon traded him to the Denver Nuggets in exchange for Ervin Johnson, signed free agent Michael Curry, and re-signed former Bucks star and sixth man Ricky Pierce in December.

After an 11–8 start to the season, the Bucks slipped under .500, but then posted a six-game winning streak between January and February, and held a 24–23 record at the All-Star break. However, with Glenn Robinson out for the remainder of the season with a knee injury after 56 games, the Bucks struggled and went on a nine-game losing streak in March. Brandon only played just 50 games due to an ankle injury, and Hill only played 57 games due to a knee injury, and a strained back. The Bucks finished seventh in the Central Division with a 36–46 record, missing the playoffs in seven straight seasons.

Robinson averaged 23.4 points and 5.5 rebounds per game, while second-year star Ray Allen had a stellar season, averaging 19.5 points and 1.4 steals per game, and Brandon provided the team with 16.8 points, 7.7 assists and 2.2 steals per game. In addition, Hill contributed 10.0 points and 10.7 rebounds per game, while Armen Gilliam provided with 11.2 points and 5.4 rebounds per game, Johnson averaged 8.0 points, 8.5 rebounds and 2.0 blocks per game, Elliot Perry contributed 7.3 points and 2.8 assists per game, and Curry contributed 6.6 points per game. 

Following the season, Pierce retired after playing in his second stint with the Bucks, while Andrew Lang signed as a free agent with the Chicago Bulls, and head coach Chris Ford was fired.

Draft picks

Roster

Regular season

Season standings

z - clinched division title
y - clinched division title
x - clinched playoff spot

Record vs. opponents

Game log

|-style="background:#bbffbb;"
| 1 || October 31, 1997 || @ Philadelphia
| W 103–88
|Ray Allen (29)
|
|
| CoreStates Center
| 1–0

|-style="background:#fcc;"
| 2 || November 1, 1997 || New Jersey
| L 109–113
|
|
|
| Bradley Center18,717
| 1–1
|-style="background:#bbffbb;"
| 3 || November 4, 1997 || Orlando
| W 110–76
|Ray Allen (20)
|
|
| Bradley Center12,764
| 2–1
|-style="background:#bbffbb;"
| 4 || November 6, 1997 || Philadelphia
| W 100–93
|
|
|
| Bradley Center13,851
| 3–1
|-style="background:#bbffbb;"
| 5 || November 8, 1997 || Boston
| W 105–96
|
|
|
| Bradley Center17,653
| 4–1
|-style="background:#fcc;"
| 6 || November 12, 1997 || @ Phoenix
| L 95–103
|
|
|
| America West Arena19,023
| 4–2
|-style="background:#bbffbb;"
| 7 || November 13, 1997 || @ L. A. Clippers
|  W 102–94
|
|
|
| Los Angeles Memorial Sports Arena4,300
| 5–2
|-style="background:#fcc;"
| 8 || November 15, 1997 || @ Vancouver
| L 94–109
|
|
|
| General Motors Place17,666
| 5–3
|-style="background:#fcc;"
| 9 || November 16, 1997 || @ Seattle
| L 99–119
|
|
|
| Key Arena17,072
| 5–4
|-style="background:#bbffbb;"
| 10 || November 18, 1997 || Detroit
| W 87–79
|
|
|
| Bradley Center13,065
| 6–4
|-style="background:#fcc;"
| 11 || November 20, 1997 || Indiana
| L 83–109
|
|
|
| Bradley Center14,106
| 6–5
|-style="background:#bbffbb;"
| 12 || November 22, 1997 || @ Dallas
| W 104–109
|
|
|
| Reunion Arena11,425
| 7–5
|-style="background:#bbffbb;"
| 13 || November 26, 1997 || Vancouver
| W 101–82
|
|
|
| Bradley Center15,126
| 8–5
|-style="background:#fcc;"
| 14 || November 28, 1997 || @ Orlando
| L 95–103
|
|
|
| Orlando Arena17,070
| 8–6
|-style="background:#bbffbb;"
| 15 || November 29, 1997 || @ Miami
| W 93–87
|
|
|
| Miami Arena14,897
| 9–6

|-style="background:#fcc;"
| 16 || December 2, 1997 || Phoenix
| L 86–90
|
|
|
| Bradley Center13,131
| 9–7
|-style="background:#bbffbb;"
| 17 || December 4, 1997 || Charlotte
| W 102–92
|
|
|
| Bradley Center13,898
| 10–7
|-style="background:#fcc;"
| 18 || December 5, 1997 || @ Chicago
| L 62–84
|
|
|
| United Center24,041
| 10–8
|-style="background:#bbffbb;"
| 19 || December 7, 1997 || Seattle
| W 97–91
|
|
|
| Bradley Center15,806
| 11–8
|-style="background:#fcc;"
| 20 || December 10, 1997 || @ Boston
| L 91–96
|
|
|
| Fleet Center17,012
| 11–9
|-style="background:#fcc;"
| 21 || December 11, 1997 || Cleveland
| L 77–79
|
|
|
| Bradley Center13,105
| 11–10
|-style="background:#fcc;"
| 22 || December 13, 1997 || Miami
| L 87–87
|
|
|
| Bradley Center15,803
| 11–11
|-style="background:#fcc;"
| 23 || December 17, 1997 || @ Charlotte
| L 90–99
|
|
|
| Charlotte Coliseum20,691
| 11–12
|-style="background:#fcc;"
| 24 || December 19, 1997 || @ Toronto
| L 91–92
|
|
|
| SkyDome15,076
| 11–13
|-style="background:#bbffbb;"
| 25 || December 20, 1997 || New York
| W 98–78
|
|
|
| Bradley Center15,955
| 12–13
|-style="background:#fcc;"
| 26 || December 22, 1997 || Washington
| L 79–110
|
|
|
| Bradley Center14,442
| 12–14
|-style="background:#bbffbb;"
| 27 || December 26, 1997 || Atlanta
| W 99–94
|
|
|
| Bradley Center17,038
| 13–14
|-style="background:#fcc;"
| 28 || December 27, 1997 || @ New Jersey
| L 104–112
|
|
|
| Meadowlands Arena16,351
| 13–15
|-style="background:#bbffbb;"
| 29 || December 30, 1997 || Dallas
| W 105–98
|
|
|
| Bradley Center14,948
| 14–15

|-style="background:#fcc;"
| 30 || January 2, 1998 || @ Chicago
| L 100–114
|
|
|
| United Center23,897
| 14–16
|-style="background:#fcc;"
| 31 || January 3, 1998 || Boston
| L 99–106
|
|
|
| Bradley Center16,211
| 14–17
|-style="background:#bbffbb;"
| 32 || January 5, 1998 || @ Portland
| W 98–92
|
|
|
| Rose Garden Arena19,215
| 15–17
|-style="background:#fcc;"
| 33 || January 7, 1998 || @ L. A. Lakers
| L 98–92
|
|
|
| Great Western Forum15,483
| 15–18

Player statistics

Transactions

Trades

Free agents

Player Transactions Citation:

References

See also
 1997-98 NBA season

Milwaukee Bucks seasons
Milwaukee Bucks
Milwaukee Bucks
Milwaukee